Kurt Krenn (28 June 1936 – 25 January 2014) was an Austrian Roman Catholic prelate and Bishop of Sankt Pölten, near Vienna, from 1991 to 2004.

Childhood and youth 
Kurt Krenn was in Rannariedl, in the municipality of Neustift im Mühlkreis in Upper Austria, the second of six children of Karl and Leopoldine Krenn. Krenn's parents had left the church in 1941. Two of their children were unbaptized at the end of World War II. Krenn's father was a teacher and was killed in World War II. After the war, the family rejoined the Catholic Church. Krenn attended elementary school in Oberkappel and graduated from high school at the Schlierbach Abbey School.

Studies, ordination to the priesthood, academic work 
Krenn entered the seminary in Linz in 1954 and studied philosophy and theology at the Gregorian University and canon law at the Lateran University in Rome from 1955 to 1965. He earned licentiate degrees in theology and canon law, as well as a doctorate in philosophy with a dissertation on "The Meaning of Being in the Condition of Participation" in Thomas Aquinas. On October 7, 1962, he was ordained a priest in the Church of Sant'Ignazio in Rome and then served as pastor in the parish of Capena - on the outskirts of Rome.

After studying in Tübingen (1966-1967) and Munich (1967-1970), where he was an assistant to Wilhelm Keilbach at the theological faculty, he was professor of philosophy at the Philosophical-Theological Institute at Linz from 1970 to 1975. In 1975 he was appointed Full Professor to the Chair of Systematic Theology at the Faculty of Catholic Theology of the University of Regensburg, which he held until 1987. He was co-editor of the Archiv für Religionspsychologie from 1978 to 1994, and from 1985 he was co-editor of the journal Forum Katholische Theologie, a conservative offshoot of the Münchener Theologische Zeitschrift.

Views
Krenn was a theological conservative. He argued against Turkey's entrance into the European Union, warning against the 'Islamisation' of Europe and calling Islam a "very aggressive kind of religion" that would not easily allow for the political unity Christian neighbors. He was known for his  criticism of the European Union.

Abuse scandal

In the fall of 2003 a scandal arose around the seminary of the diocese of St. Pölten because of homosexual acts and child pornography. The seminarian Piotr Zarlinski, who had the porn on his computer, was sentenced to a six-month conditional prison sentence. In addition, there were homosexual relations in the seminary. The scandal provoked massive internal and external church criticism. Bishop Klaus Küng was appointed Apostolic Visitator to investigate the allegations. The seminary was temporarily closed. On Sept. 29, 2004, Krenn resigned from his episcopate at the request of Pope John Paul II, though without confirming the accusations. Klaus Küng was eventually appointed the new bishop.

References

External links
Official website (in German) 

1936 births
2014 deaths
Roman Catholic bishops of Sankt Pölten

Christian critics of Islam
Critics of Islamism
People from Upper Austria
Pontifical Gregorian University alumni
Pontifical Lateran University alumni
Collegium Germanicum et Hungaricum alumni